Polytehnitis kai erimospitis ( (English: Jack of all trades and master of one) is a 1963 Greek comedy film directed by Alekos Sakellarios.

Cast 
 Thanasis Veggos - Thanasis Birbilis
 Marika Krevata - Maria's mother
 Giorgos Gavriilidis - father posing for a picture
 Niki Linardou - Maria
 Giannis Vogiatzis - restaurant customer
 Betty Moshona - Rena
 Dimitris Nikolaidis - Thodoros Bakatsoularas
 Katerina Yioulaki - Johnny's mother
 Gizela Dali - La bella Lucia
 Athinodoros Prousalis - Panagos
 Giorgos Tzifos - restaurant owner

References

External links 

1963 comedy films
1963 films
Greek comedy films